Dilolo is a territory in the Lualaba Province  of the Democratic Republic of the Congo.

Territories of Lualaba Province